The Tamil Nadu State Film Award for Best Film is given by the Filmfare magazine as part of its annual Tamil Nadu State Film Awards for Tamil  (Kollywood) films.

References

Tamil Nadu State Film Awards